Maurice Longbottom (born 30 January 1995) is an Australian rugby league and rugby union player who played his first game for the Australia national rugby sevens team at the 2018 Sydney Sevens tournament of the World Rugby Sevens Series.

Longbottom played some matches for the South Sydney Rabbitohs junior squad, but was described as "too small for senior footy". Longbottom's performance in the Oktoberfest Sevens drew the attention of Australia rugby sevens team coach Andy Friend.

Longbottom was a member of the Australian men's rugby seven's squad at the Tokyo 2020 Olympics. The team came third in their pool round and then lost to Fiji 19-0 in the quarterfinal. He competed for Australia at the 2022 Rugby World Cup Sevens in Cape Town.

Personal life
Longbottom is a Dharawal. He once expressed that he wants to inspire the next generation of Indigenous athletes.

References

Living people
Australian rugby union players
Indigenous Australian sportspeople
1995 births
Rugby sevens players at the 2020 Summer Olympics
Olympic rugby sevens players of Australia
Rugby sevens players at the 2022 Commonwealth Games